Claudia Bassols Alonso (born October 3, 1979) is a Spanish actress from Barcelona, Spain.

Career
Bassols graduated from the American School of Barcelona in 1997, earned a degree in Musical Comedy from Coco Comín in Barcelona, and studied English language and literature at the University of Barcelona. She has also studied drama in Paris, London, Los Angeles, North Carolina (UNC Wilmington), and Australia (NIDA). Bassols speaks Catalan, Spanish, English, French, Italian, and Swedish.

Bassols appeared with Amber Tamblyn in the 2008 film Blackout; and in 2008 was featured in the PBS series Spain... on the Road Again alongside Mario Batali, Gwyneth Paltrow, and Mark Bittman. In 2009 Bassols filmed a lead role for The Eagle Path with Jean-Claude Van Damme. After a 2010 screening at Cannes, additional footage was shot in Sofia Bulgaria in 2012, and the recut film has been released as Full Love.

In October 2010 Bassols was included in Esquire magazine's Sexiest Women Alive Atlas.

Filmography
Spanish or Catalan language (title links are to Spanish Wikipedia)
 Mis adorables vecinos: "Hasta el 2016" (March 19, 2006) as Sheila
 El Mundo de Chema (11 episodes, 2006) as Carmen
 El Coronel Macià (2006) as Núria/Secretaria La Veu – A film about Francesc Macià, with some dialog in Catalan, French, and English
 C.L.A No somos ángeles (59 episodes, 2007) as Elena Rincón
 Amar en tiempos revueltos (26 episodes, 2008) as Esperanza
 Anna (2008) as Anna – with some dialog in French and Catalan
 La Riera  (12 episodes, 2010) as Laia
 Gavilanes (26 episodes, 2010–2011) as Norma Elizondo

English language
 Blackout (2008) as Pretty Woman
 Spain... on the Road Again (2008, 13 episodes) as herself
 Paintball (2009) as Claudia
 The Eagle Path / Full Love (2010/2014) as Sophia
 Emulsion (2010) as Isabella
 One in the Chamber (2012, aka Shoot the Killer) as Janice Knowles
 Rob (TV series) (2012) as Maggie
 The Returned (2014) as Amber
 Knightfall (TV series) (2017) as Queen Elena of Aragon

References

External links
 Official homepage
 

Living people
Actresses from Barcelona
Film actresses from Catalonia
Television actresses from Catalonia
1979 births
University of North Carolina at Wilmington alumni